The Andorran Permanent representative to the Headquarters of the United Nations has his residence in New York City is also accredited as Ambassador to the governments in the United States of America, Canada and the United Mexican States.

Andorra established relations with the United States in February 1995. It was by means of an exchange of letters. The Andorran government requested to establish full diplomatic relations and the Secretary of State reciprocated by appointing our Consul General in Barcelona as representative of the United States to Andorra for diplomatic and consular affairs. In 1998, with the change of U.S. Ambassador in Madrid, it was agreed the U.S. government would accredit the same Ambassador to Andorra.

List of heads of mission

References 

 
United States
Andorra